Neophyl can mean:

 neophyl group, trivial name of 2-methyl-2-phenylpropyl functional group, PhC(CH3)2CH2- (e.g. in neophyl chloride)
 one of trade names of diprophylline